The tenth season of NCIS: Los Angeles an American police procedural drama television series, originally aired on CBS from September 30, 2018, through May 19, 2019. The season was produced by CBS Television Studios, with R. Scott Gemmill as showrunner and executive producer.

The season featured the return of David James Elliot and Catherine Bell as Harmon Rabb and Sarah MacKenzie from JAG; it also revealed the outcome of the JAG series finale in 2005. This was also the last season to feature Nia Long as Shay Mosley.

For the 2018–19 U.S. television season, the tenth season of NCIS: Los Angeles ranked #28 with an average of 9.85 million viewers.

Cast and characters

Main
 Chris O'Donnell as Grisha "G." Callen, NCIS Supervisory Special Agent
 Daniela Ruah as Kensi Blye, NCIS Junior Field Agent
 Eric Christian Olsen as Marty Deeks, LAPD/NCIS Liaison Detective
 Barrett Foa as Eric Beale, NCIS Technical Operator
 Renée Felice Smith as Nell Jones, NCIS Special Agent and Intelligence Analyst
 Nia Long as Shay Mosley, NCIS Executive Assistant Director for Pacific Operations (EADPAC) (episodes 1–6)
 Linda Hunt as Henrietta Lange, NCIS Supervisory Special Agent (SSA) and Operations Manager
 LL Cool J as Sam Hanna, NCIS Senior Field Agent, Second in Command

Recurring
 Esai Morales as Louis Occhoa, NCIS Deputy Director
 Vyto Ruginis as Arkady Kolcheck
 Bar Paly as Anastasia "Anna" Kolcheck, an ATF agent, Arkady's daughter and Callen's girlfriend.
 Elizabeth Bogush as Joelle Taylor, CIA agent
 Gerald McRaney as Hollace Kilbride, retired Navy admiral 
 Erik Palladino as CIA Officer Vostanik Sabatino
 Marsha Thomason as Nicole Dechamps, NCIS Special Agent, former Secret Service special agent
 Peter Jacobson as John Rogers, special prosecutor
 Max Martini as Arlo Turk
 Karina Logue as LAPD Detective Ellen Whiting
 Paulina Olszynski as Tiffany Williams
 Pamela Reed as Roberta Deeks
 Douglas Weston as Alex Elmslie
 Laura Harring as Julia Feldman
 Medalion Rahimi as NCIS Special Agent Fatima Namazi
 Ravil Isyanov as Anatoli Kirkin
 Mercedes Mason as Talia Del Campo
 Daniel J. Travanti as Nikita Aleksandr Reznikov / Garrison, Callen's father

Guest
 Bill Goldberg as Lance Hamilton, DOJ Agent
 TJ Ramini as Tobin Shaked
 Shane McMahon as Steve Evans, Army CID Special Agent
Alyssa Diaz as Jasmine Garcia
Gil Birmingham as Navy Captain Steven Douglas
 Don Wallace as Navy Seal Senior Chief Frank Wallace
 Drew Waters as Brian Bush, FBI Agent
 Dina Meyer as Veronica Stephens
 Eve Harlow as Kate Miller/Katya

Special Guest Stars
David James Elliot as Harmon Rabb
 Catherine Bell as Sarah MacKenzie

Episodes

Production

Development
NCIS: Los Angeles was renewed for a 24-episode tenth season on April 18, 2018.

Casting 
Linda Hunt took time off from this season while recovering from a car accident.

Broadcast
Season ten of NCIS: Los Angeles premiered on September 30, 2018.

Reception

Ratings

Home media

References

10
2018 American television seasons
2019 American television seasons
Works about Mexican drug cartels